Alias the Deacon is a 1940 American comedy film directed by Christy Cabanne and written by Nat Perrin and Charles Grayson. It is based on the 1925 play The Deacon by John B. Hymer and LeRoy Clemens. The film stars Bob Burns, Mischa Auer, Peggy Moran, Dennis O'Keefe, Edward Brophy, Thurston Hall, Spencer Charters, Jack Carson and Guinn "Big Boy" Williams. The film was released on May 17, 1940, by Universal Pictures.

Cast        
Bob Burns as Deke Caswell
Mischa Auer as Andre
Peggy Moran as Phyllis
Dennis O'Keefe as Johnny Sloan
Edward Brophy as Stuffy
Thurston Hall as Jim Cunningham
Spencer Charters as Sheriff Yates
Jack Carson as Sullivan
Guinn "Big Boy" Williams as Bull Gumbatz 
Virginia Brissac as Elsie Clark
Benny Bartlett as Willie Clark
Mira McKinney as Mrs. Gregory
Janet Shaw as Mildred Gregory

References

External links
 

1940 films
American comedy films
1940 comedy films
Universal Pictures films
Films directed by Christy Cabanne
American black-and-white films
1940s English-language films
1940s American films